Rajakkad is a town in the Idukki district in the Indian state of Kerala situated in the Western Ghats.

Rajakkad has a clutch of beautiful tourist spots such as Kallimali View Point, Ponmudi Dam, Kanakakunnu View Point and Kuthumkal Waterfalls. Located around 28km from Munnar, the Kuthumkal Waterfalls offers a perfect ambience for Nature lovers with the mist emerging from surging waters giving a pleasant experience to all. With most of the residents depended on farming, black pepper, cardamom and ginger plantations can be seen in the region.

Economy 
Most of Rajakkad's inhabitants depend on farming. The main crops are elaichi, black pepper, cardamom and ginger.Tourism is also one of the Income generator of this region Including Hotels,Homestays and restaurants.

Demographics
As of 2011 Census, Rajakkad had a population of 16,486 with 8,229 males and 8,257 females. In Rajakkad, 9.2% of the population was under 6 years of age. Rajakkad had an average literacy of 96.7% higher than the state average of 94%: male literacy was 97.9% and female literacy was 95.5%.

Transport
Private and KSRTC buses reach major cities such as Ernakulam, Kottayam, Muvattupuzha, Kattappana, Pala, Adimali, and Kothamangalam. The nearest airport is Cochin International Airport 99 km away while the nearest railway station is Aluva railway station 98 km away.

The main routes connecting Rajakkad with other towns are;
 Rajakkad - Adimaly - Kothamangalam - Perumbavoor - Aluva- Ernakulam
 Rajakkad - Poopara - Nedumkandam- Kattappana
 Rajakkad - Adimaly - Thodupuzha - Pala - Kottayam

Education

Colleges

Schools

Places of worship

References
2. https://idukki.nic.in/directory/grama-panchayat-rajakkad/
www. idukkidirectory.com

External links

Villages in Idukki district